Ivan Palúch (20 June 1940 - 3 July 2015) was a Slovak actor. He appeared in more than forty films from 1967 to 2015.

Selected filmography

References

External links 

1940 births
2015 deaths
People from Zvolen
Slovak male film actors
20th-century Slovak male actors